High Leven is a village within the borough of Stockton-on-Tees and ceremonial county of North Yorkshire, England, and is located towards the mouth of the River Leven. It has a public house called The Fox Covert (previously Half Moon Inn) and a co-operative food store, open every day 05:00 to 24:00, with an ATM and petrol station.

Administration
Administratively, this village is in the borough of Stockton-on-Tees, made a unitary authority in 1996, before which High Leven was in the county of Cleveland, a creation of the Local Government Act 1972 which abolished the Stokesley Rural District in the North Riding of Yorkshire.

High Leven, which is part of the Ingleby Barwick East ward (and also includes Hilton and Maltby) has three local councillors sitting on Stockton borough council all of whom are members of Ingleby Barwick Independent Society.

Geography
The village is located to the east of Yarm at the top of Leven Bank.

See also
Low Leven - neighbouring hamlet at the bottom of Leven Bank

References

External links

Villages in North Yorkshire
Borough of Stockton-on-Tees
Places in the Tees Valley